Ermengarde of Anjou ( – 18 March 1076), known as Blanche, was a Duchess consort of Burgundy. She was the daughter of Count Fulk III of Anjou and Hildegarde of Sundgau. She was sometimes known as Ermengarde-Blanche.

She married Geoffrey II, Count of Gâtinais  (in French Geoffroy), called Ferréol and sometimes known as Aubri, seigneur de Château-Landon. Together they had:

Hildegarde de Château-Landon, married c.1060 to Joscelin I, Lord of Courtenay
Geoffrey III, Count of Anjou
Fulk IV, Count of Anjou

Geoffrey II died sometime between 1043 and 1046, and Ermengarde's mother died while on pilgrimage to Jerusalem in 1046. 

Ermengarde married Robert I, Duke of Burgundy in 1046, conferring on her the title Duchess of Burgundy.  They had:

Hildegarde (–1104), who married Duke William VIII of Aquitaine around 1067

Ermengarde died 18 March 1076, at the Church of Fleurey-sur-Ouche.

References

Sources

Duchesses of Burgundy
1010s births
1076 deaths
Year of birth uncertain